Damien O'Donnell (born 1967 in Dublin) is an Irish film director and writer. 

He has directed East is East (1999), Heartlands (2002) and Inside I'm Dancing (2004), amongst others. 

He is from Coolock, Dublin. He has also directed advertisements for Bulmers Original Dry Irish Cider, which is brewed in Clonmel, Co. Tipperary. 

He won the Empire Award for Best Newcomer and received a British Independent Film Awards nomination for East is East.

References

External links 
 

1967 births
Irish film directors
People from Coolock
Living people